Captain William Henry Irvine Shakespear (29 October 1878 – 24 January 1915), was a British civil servant and explorer who mapped uncharted areas of Northern Arabia and made the first official British contact with Ibn Sa'ud, future king of Saudi Arabia. He was the military adviser to Ibn Sa'ud from 1910 to 1915, when he was shot and killed in the Battle of Jarrab by Ibn Shraim. He was buried in Kuwait.

Arabian expeditions
While in Kuwait, Shakespear made seven separate expeditions into the Arabian interior, during which he became a close friend of Ibn Sa'ud, then the Emir of the Nejd. It was Shakespear who arranged for Ibn Sa'ud to be photographed for the first time. Ibn Sa'ud had never seen a camera before. In March 1914, Shakespear began a  journey from Kuwait to Riyadh and on to Aqaba via the Nafud Desert, which he mapped and studied in great detail, the first European to do so.  In November 1914, the British government in India asked Shakespear to secure Ibn Sa'ud's support for the British-Indian Mesopotamian Expeditionary Force, which had just taken Basra.

Aftermath
It has been suggested by some authorities, notably St. John Philby, that the Arab Revolt against the Ottoman Empire might have been very differently directed if Shakespear had survived, that the British would have supported and armed Ibn Sa'ud rather than Sherif Hussein ibn Ali. 

"His death... was a great loss to his country, but it was a disaster to the Arab cause. It must certainly be reckoned in the small category of individual events which have changed the course of history. Had he survived to continue a work for which he was so eminently suited, it is extremely doubtful whether subsequent campaigns of Lawrence would ever have taken place in the west..."

Arabia, H. St. John Philby, London (1930), pp 233 - 234.

External links

Biography, with a picture.
 The Captain and the King, from Saudi Aramco World.
 Notes by the biographer Harry Victor F. Winstone and David Wingate on a Shakespeare Family Genealogical Site
 Memorial Stone
BBC - Shakespear of Arabia

1878 births
1915 deaths
Military personnel from Mumbai
English explorers
Explorers of Asia
Explorers of Arabia
British Indian Army officers
Devonshire Regiment officers
Graduates of the Royal Military College, Sandhurst
British military personnel killed in World War I
People educated at King William's College
Expatriates from the United Kingdom in Arabia